The 1971 Oregon State Beavers football team represented Oregon State University in the Pacific-8 Conference (Pac-8) during the 1971 NCAA University Division football season.  In their seventh season under head coach Dee Andros, the Beavers compiled a 5–6 record (3–3 in Pac-8, fifth), and were outscored 295 to 131.   They played three home games on campus at Parker Stadium in Corvallis, with one at Civic Stadium in Portland.

Oregon State defeated rival Oregon in the Civil War game for the eighth consecutive year.

This was the first of 28 consecutive losing seasons for the Beavers, and OSU did not win five games in a season again until 1998.

Schedule

Roster
Steve Brown, Jr. (defense)
Erin Haynes (Center)

Game summaries

Oregon

References

Oregon State
Oregon State Beavers football seasons
Oregon State Beavers football